Ira & Abby is a 2006 American romantic comedy film directed by Robert Cary and released in the United States by Magnolia Pictures. The poignant love story stars Chris Messina and Jennifer Westfeldt (who also wrote the screenplay) in the title roles, and co-stars Fred Willard, Frances Conroy, Jason Alexander, Robert Klein, Judith Light and a small early role by Jon Hamm as Ronnie.

Plot

Ira Black (Chris Messina) is a 33-year-old psychology Ph.D. candidate with therapist parents. Black has been in an on-and-off relationship with Lea (Maddie Corman) for the past nine years and is unsatisfied with their relationship on many levels. His therapist informs him that their 12 years of doctor-patient relationship must come to a close as therapy clearly is not helping him. The therapist encourages Black to be spontaneous, finish his dissertation, and do things he would not normally do.

Ira goes to his favorite cafe and struggles (as usual) to order. While he is eating his meal, he looks across the street to see a gym and remembers that Lea found him overweight. After his meal, he goes to the gym and makes an appointment for a tour and waits 45 minutes before Abby (Jennifer Westfeldt) arrives to show him around.

Ira is soon struck by Abby's ability to be involved in other people's lives. She seems to know everyone at the gym and be a trusted source of advice and a good listening ear. 
After Abby gives Ira a tour of the gym, they spend the next six hours talking in an unused yoga room. Ira discovers that Abby lives with her parents who are musicians. At the end of their conversation, she proposes marriage to Ira, who is initially shocked. Eventually he agrees and the two consummate their engagement in her office.

Both Ira and Abby return home to tell their parents of their engagement. Ira's parents are upset that it's not Leah, and Abby's are extremely excited and begin to plan their daughter's wedding right away. Later that night, Ira and Abby talk about their future and make an agreement to have sex every day.

The two marry and spend the evening together at Abby's family's house. When they attempt to return to Ira's apartment to enjoy their wedding night, the car they hired breaks down, leading them to get mugged at gunpoint, though they are unharmed.

Over the next weeks, Ira and Abby adjust to being married and enjoy shopping for their apartment. They attend the movies and awkwardly run into Leah, which brings Ira's worries about Abby to the front of his mind. The two begin marriage counseling. At the same time, Ira's mother and Abby's father begin to have an affair after Ira's mother begins a voice-over career. When the families take a holiday picture (Abby's family's tradition), Ira learns that Abby was married twice before. Angry that she did not tell him, Ira asks for and gets an annulment. After returning to Dr. Friedman (his old therapist) and realizing how much he loves Abby, Ira proposes again, and the two remarry.

After the second wedding, with the two ex-husbands in attendance, things seem to get better. One day, Abby meets Leah at the gym, and Leah confides in her that she misses her ex. Not realizing that she is talking about Ira, Abby offers her advice; that she should get in contact with him for closure. Not long after that, Abby goes to dinner with one of her ex-husbands. Ira is extremely worried, so he takes Leah up on her offer for drinks. The two go to her apartment and kiss. Guilt-racked Ira returns home to find Abby sobbing on their couch, afraid that he was cheating and emotionally rattled from her dinner. The next day, Leah and Abby meet for lunch and discuss their evenings. When Ira walks in to meet Abby, the two women realize that he is the man they are both talking about.

Following this latest escapade, Abby pulls all of the therapists that she, her parents, Ira, and Ira's parents have ever used into one room for a giant session. After a while, Ira and Abby realize that they can put their differences aside and love each other. The film ends with the two of them divorcing and vowing to love each other.

Reviews
 "Out of His Navel and Into a Life" - The New York Times
 "Too-cute 'Ira & Abby' needs a little help" - The Boston Globe
 Cinematical
 Cinema Clock

External links
 
 
 
 
 Trailer at Apple.com

2006 romantic comedy films
2006 films
American romantic comedy films
Films scored by Marcelo Zarvos
Magnolia Pictures films
2000s English-language films
2000s American films